Long Beach State athletics, or simply Beach athletics (previously known as the 49ers), are the athletic teams that represent California State University, Long Beach. Teams compete in 19 sports at the National Collegiate Athletic Association (NCAA) Division I level. Long Beach State is a founding member of the Big West Conference, and also competes in the Mountain Pacific Sports Federation and the Golden Coast Conference for sports not sponsored by the Big West.

Nickname
In the realm of sports the school is referred to as "Long Beach State." The university's intercollegiate athletics program will continue to use "Beach Athletics", and its teams the prefix moniker "Beach" as it is the only university on the West Coast and only NCAA Division I university with the word "Beach" in its name. One can see the cheer "Go Beach!" written on many CSULB products around campus and on the large water tower near the entrance to the campus. "'49er" remains an informal nickname and identifier for anyone affiliated with the university. The term "'49er" references the institution's founding year. The baseball team will continue to be the Dirtbags.

Sports sponsored

Baseball 

Unlike all other Long Beach State sports teams, the baseball team unofficially goes under the moniker "The Dirtbags." After the hiring of Dave Snow as head coach in 1989, the LBSU baseball team has become one of the most successful teams in the school's athletic history. The Dirtbags are consistently ranked in the national top 35 and have appeared in 17 of the last 20 NCAA tournaments. Along the way, the team has won 9 Big West conference championships, hosted 4 NCAA regionals (plus 1 super regional), and appeared in 4 College World Series (1989, 1991, 1993 and 1998). The Dirtbags nickname referred to a gritty, team first style of play taught by Coach Snow and subsequent coaches.

Mike Weathers became 'Dirtbag' head coach in 2001.  Upon Weather's retirement, he was succeeded by assistant Troy Buckley in 2010.

The school has also produced a number of prominent professional players over the years, including former American League MVP Jason Giambi, former American League Rookie of the Year Bobby Crosby, and all-star and 2008 American League Rookie of the Year Evan Longoria. Many more ex-Dirtbags have participated in the prestigious MLB All-Star Futures game, such as rookie phenomenons Jered Weaver, Troy Tulowitzki and Danny Espinosa.  Nine Long Beach State baseball alumni were playing in the big leagues during 2013.

The baseball team plays off campus at 3,238-seat Blair Field in Recreation Park (center of city; 1.7 miles off campus). Opened in 1956 and remodeled in 1992, Blair Field has been the full-time Long Beach State home field since 1993.

Basketball 

Long Beach State men's and women's basketball teams compete in the Big West Conference. The teams play their home games at the Walter Pyramid.

Men's basketball 
On April 6, 2007, it was announced that Dan Monson (formerly of Gonzaga University and the University of Minnesota) would become Long Beach State's next head men's basketball coach, succeeding Larry Reynolds.

Women's basketball 
The women's basketball team had its greatest success during the 1980s when coached by Joan Bonvicini for 12 years. During that time the team went 325–71. The Beach won 10 Big West Conference titles, made 10 straight NCAA appearances, had 12 consecutive winning seasons, and never won fewer than 24 games in a season. Bonvicini guided the Beach to Final Four appearances in 1987 and 1988.

Cross country 
The Long Beach State Beach men's cross country team appeared in the NCAA tournament six times, with their highest finish being 10th place in the 1971–72 school year.

The Long Beach State Beach women's cross country team has never made the NCAA tournament.

Women's soccer 
The Long Beach State women's soccer team have an NCAA Division I Tournament record of 3–7 through seven appearances.

Women's tennis 
Long Beach State women's tennis team ('Beach Tennis') competes in the Big West Conference. As of the end of the 2018–19 season, the team has won thirteen Big West tennis titles since 2002 and qualified for thirteen NCAA tournament championships since 2002; advancing to the Round of 32 three times.

Head Coach Jenny Hilt-Costello has won a league record eight Big West Conference Coach of the Year awards (2001, 2004, 2005, 2006, 2008, 2009, 2012, 2014) and was named the ITA West Region Coach of the Year and a finalist for the national award in 2004.

The women's tennis team plays at the Terry L. Rhodes Tennis Center, which opened on campus Fall 2008. The tennis center is named after 49er alumnus Terry Rhodes following his $1.25 million gift to the women's tennis program. Rhodes' gift is the largest single sport donation in university history.

Volleyball

Men's volleyball 

The men's volleyball competed in the Mountain Pacific Sports Federation and now in the Big West Conference. They won the MPSF regular season title in 2008 and 2017 and the Big West Conference regular season titles in 2018 and 2019. They won the 1991, 2018 and 2019 NCAA Men's Volleyball Championship and have placed second five times.

The Long Beach State Beach men's volleyball team have an NCAA Division I Tournament record of 21–9 through eleven appearances.

Women's volleyball 
Long Beach State is home to one of the top women's volleyball teams in the nation. LBSU alumnus Brian Gimmillaro has coached the team since 1985 and his tenure is the second-longest of any Long Beach State coach with one team. Long Beach State has appeared in the NCAA tournament 25 consecutive times under Gimmillaro from 1987 to 2011, only missing the tournament under his tenure in 1986 and 2012.

Long Beach State has won three national titles in women's volleyball, in 1989, 1993 and 1998. The 1998 women's team was the first team in NCAA Division I history to have an undefeated season. The team's most famous alumna is Misty May, who won three Olympic gold medals in Beach Volleyball in 2004,  2008, and 2012.

The Long Beach State Beach women's volleyball team have an NCAA Division I Tournament record of 49–24 through twenty-seven appearances.

Water polo 
The Long Beach State men's water polo team competes in the Golden Coast Conference.

The men's team has an NCAA Division I Tournament record of 7–12 through twelve appearances.

The Long Beach State women's water polo team competes in the Big West Conference.

Former varsity sports

Football 

Long Beach State competed in Division I football for a number of years (1969–91), producing a number of professional players, including Terrell Davis and Mike Horan, among others.  George Allen, the famed Los Angeles Rams and Washington Redskins coach, had a short one-year tenure at Long Beach State. Long Beach State discontinued its football program after the 1991 season due to budget constraints. Prior to going Division I in 1969 the football team competed in the old "College Division" of the NCAA from 1955 through 1968.

Rowing (Crew)
Long Beach State Rowing, also known as Beach Crew, was initially a varsity sport but has since become a club sport following nationwide changes to the organization of collegiate rowing following the introduction of Title IX. 

Despite its status as a club sport Beach Crew continues to uphold a storied legacy and remains a highly competitive program on the West Coast.

Non-varsity sports
In addition to NCAA-sanctioned sports, Long Beach State also fields numerous competitive club sports teams, such as rugby, ice hockey, ultimate, soccer, crew, skiing and many others.

Rowing (crew)
Long Beach State Rowing, more popularly known as "Beach Crew," was founded in the fall semester of 1957, and continues to be one of the oldest, continuous, collegiate sports on campus. The team is currently run through the office of Club Sports & Recreation, but has been a part of the CSULB athletic department in past years. The team was co-founded by Bill Lockyer, a local businessman of Long Beach, and Dr. Ludwig Spolyar, a campus activities adviser. Lockyer, who coached for over a decade, was succeeded by Ed Graham in 1970.

Long Beach State Rowing is a member of the Western Intercollegiate Rowing Association (WIRA), whose participants are mostly non-Pac-10 schools on the West Coast. The team is a founding member of the American Collegiate Rowing Association (ACRA), the national collegiate organization whose members are not eligible to compete in the National NCAA Championships or the Intercollegiate Rowing Association Championships.

In the 2022 spring season Long Beach State’s double sculls placed first in WIRA. The team overall would later place 9th in small boats at ACRA and became the 2nd best small boats program on the west coast.

The team is currently coached by Mike Long, John O’Donnell, and former US National Team member Scott Erwin.

Beach Crew rows in Alamitos Bay and Marine Stadium in Long Beach. The boathouse, The Pete Archer Rowing Center, was established in 1932. Marine Stadium was built for the 1932 Olympics and is listed as a historic landmark by the State of California. In 2020 it was announced that Marine Stadium will once again host Olympic Rowing in 2028.

Rugby
Founded in 1974, the Long Beach State Rugby Club plays college rugby at the Long Beach State rugby field. The rugby team moved up from playing as a Division I-AA member of the Golden Coast Conference of Intercollegiate Rugby and became a Division I-A member of the California Collegiate Conference in 2022, which also means moving from American College Rugby to the College Rugby Association of America, the top level of college rugby recognized by USA Rugby. Long Beach has had a strong history winning 16 League Championships, 21 tournament championships, 1 National Championship appearance(loss to Air Force 1989), 13 All-Americans and 3 US Eagles. In 1995 Chris Rohrbach received the Woodley Award (Rugby Heisman) as the Collegiate player of the year. More recently Long Beach has been successful, Winning conference championships in 2012, 2013, 2014, 2015. Long Beach has also reached the national playoffs in 2011, 2012, 2013, 2014 & 2015. Long Beach is led by Head Coach Jason Reynolds.

Championships

Appearances
The Long Beach State Beach competed in the NCAA tournament across 16 active sports (8 men's and 8 women's) 203 times at the Division I level.

 Baseball (21): 1970, 1989, 1991, 1992, 1993, 1994, 1995, 1996, 1997, 1998, 1999, 2001, 2002, 2003, 2004, 2005, 2007, 2008, 2014, 2016, 2017
 Men's basketball (9): 1970, 1971, 1972, 1973, 1977, 1993, 1995, 2007, 2012
 Women's basketball (12): 1982, 1983, 1984, 1985, 1986, 1987, 1988, 1989, 1990, 1991, 1992, 2017
 Beach volleyball (1): 2017
 Men's cross country (6): 1969, 1970, 1971, 1972, 1974, 1975
 Men's golf (5): 1971, 1972, 1973, 1974, 1982
 Women's soccer (7): 2008, 2010, 2011, 2012, 2015, 2016, 2018
 Softball (33): 1986, 1987, 1988, 1989, 1990, 1991, 1992, 1993, 1996, 1997, 1998, 1999, 2000, 2003, 2004, 2005, 2006, 2008, 2009, 2011, 2012, 2014, 2016, 2018
 Women's tennis (13): 2002, 2004, 2005, 2006, 2007, 2008, 2009, 2011, 2012, 2013, 2014, 2015, 2019
 Men's indoor track and field (11): 1965, 1972, 1976, 1977, 1981, 1997, 1998, 1999, 2007, 2009, 2017
 Women's indoor track and field (2): 1998, 2000
 Men's outdoor track and field (23): 1964, 1966, 1970, 1971, 1973, 1974, 1975, 1976, 1977, 1978, 1981, 1982, 1983, 1995, 1997, 1998, 1999, 2004, 2006, 2007, 2008, 2014, 2019
 Women's outdoor track and field (10): 1982, 1983, 1984, 1990, 1992, 1995, 2000, 2001, 2007, 2011
 Men's volleyball (11): 1970, 1973, 1990, 1991, 1999, 2004, 2008, 2016, 2017, 2018, 2019
 Women's volleyball (27): 1985, 1987, 1988, 1989, 1990, 1991, 1992, 1993, 1994, 1995, 1996, 1997, 1998, 1999, 2000, 2001, 2002, 2003, 2004, 2005, 2006, 2007, 2008, 2009, 2010, 2011, 2014
 Men's water polo (12): 1969, 1970, 1971, 1973, 1975, 1981, 1983, 1985, 1988, 1989, 1991, 2018

Team
The Beach of Long Beach State earned 6 NCAA championships at the Division I level.

Men's (3)
 Volleyball (3): 1991, 2018, 2019
Women's (5)
 Volleyball (5): 1972, 1973, 1989, 1993, 1998

Results

Long Beach State won 3 national championships at the NCAA Division II level.
 Men's swimming and diving: 1968
 Men's tennis: 1967
 Men's outdoor track and field: 1967

Below are six national championships that were not bestowed by the NCAA.  
Women (6)
Badminton (2): 1970, 1974 (AIAW)
Field hockey (1): 1979 (AIAW)
Volleyball (2): 1972–73 season, 1973 (fall) (AIAW)
Beach volleyball (1): 2013 (AVCA)

Below are five national club team championships won at the highest collegiate level.
Archery (recurve) (1): 2015 (mixed team)
Roller hockey (1): 2011
Sailing (2): 1966 match race, 1981 team race
Surfing (1): 2001

Individual
Long Beach State had 16 athletes win NCAA individual championships at the Division I level.

At the NCAA Division II level, Long Beach State garnered 29 individual championships.

National award winners

Traditions

Coaches
Long Beach has had a number of nationally prominent coaches in its history, including Tex Winter, Jerry Tarkanian and Lute Olson in men's basketball, George Allen in football,  Frances Schaafsma in women's volleyball and basketball, Joan Bonvicini in women's basketball, Anita Miller Huntsman in women’s field hockey, throwing coach Art Venegas in track and field, and Jon Urbanchek and Don Gambril in swimming.

Mascot
In spring 2018, the school's previous mascot, "Prospector Pete", was retired. On May 10, 2019, the school announced that its new mascot will be a shark, although there are no current plans for the school to be officially known as the "Sharks".

Olympics
Long Beach State has had an athlete participate in every Summer Olympic Games since the first Olympiad after the school's founding.

School colors
The school colors have been black and gold since 2000, when they were changed by a student referendum (after George Allen changed the football uniform colors) from the original brown and gold.

Rivalries
Beach Athletics has several rival schools in the sports in which it competes. Besides being located in close proximity to each other, Long Beach State and the Cal State Fullerton Titans have competed heavily as conference rivals. Since 2006, Long Beach State and the UC Irvine Anteaters have participated in the annual "Black and Blue Rivalry Series." In this challenge, each school earns points for its collective conference championships and head-to-head victories against each other (across all NCAA sports in which both schools participate). The totals are added up at the end of the season and a winner is declared. Finally, Long Beach State also has a long-standing "beach school" rivalry with the UC Santa Barbara Gauchos.

References

External links